Mookgophong Local Municipality was a municipality located in the Waterberg District Municipality of Limpopo province, South Africa. The seat of Mookgophong Local Municipality was Mookgophong.

The Municipality was named after the type of tree found in the area, Mokgopa (a cactus).

After municipal elections on 3 August 2016 it was merged into the larger Modimolle–Mookgophong Local Municipality.

Main places
The 2001 census divided the municipality into the following main places:

Politics 
The municipal council consisted of ten members elected by mixed-member proportional representation. Five councillors were elected by first-past-the-post voting in five wards, while the remaining five were chosen from party lists so that the total number of party representatives was proportional to the number of votes received. In the election of 18 May 2011 the African National Congress (ANC) won a majority of six seats on the council.
The following table shows the results of the election.

References

External links 
 Official homepage

Former local municipalities of South Africa